The  is a Japanese bus company. It was formed by Keisei Bus (Keisei Group) and Oriental Land Company, on 2 February 1999. Keisei Transit Bus has two barns, one in Shiohama Ichikawa, the other in Chidori Urayasu.

History
This company was established in 1999 to transport passengers and staff to the Tokyo Disney Resort by bus.

In 2001, as the bus department of Keisei Electric Railway was split into parent and child companies, the Urayasu Line and Gyotoku Line were transferred to Keisei Transit Bus from Keisei Electric Railway. Simultaneously, the Braki Line and Ōsu Line were transferred to Ichikawa Kōtsū from Keisei Electric Railway. In 2006, Kaijin Line was transferred from Keisei Bus Funabashi Office, giving it a bus route in Funabashi. In 2009, Ōsu Line and Baraki Line were transferred from Ichikawa Kōtsū. This company operated five bus routes thereafter.

Ichikawa Kotsu was renamed Keisei Taxi Ichikawa in 2012. This companies' main operation has been taxis since the bus routes transferred to Keisei Transit Bus in 2009.

This company commenced operating a highway bus route connecting Chōfu Station (Tokyo) and Tokyo Disney Resort in step with Keio Bus. The Ichikawa・GyotokuーHaneda Airport Line was transferred to the company in July 2014.

Bus route

Highway buses

Route buses
Urayasu Line
(浦安01/02/03/04/10) Mutually operated from Urayasu Station (Chiba) and Shin-Urayasu Station or Ichikawa-Shiohama Station through Motoyawata Station or Ichikawa Station and Motoyawata Station respectively
(浦安05) Urayasu Station (Chiba) - High Town Shiohama - Ichikawa-Shiohama Station
Gyotoku Line (行徳01/02/03) 
Ichikawa-Shiohama Station - Gyotoku Station - Myoden Station 
Myoden Line (妙典05) 
Myoden Station - Baraki-Nakayama Station - Motoyawata Station
Futamata Line (二俣01) 
Futamata-Shinmachi Station - Baraki-Nakayama Station - Motoyawata Station
Shiohama Line (塩浜01/02/03)
Ichikawa-Shiohama Station - Myoden Station
Kaijin Line (西船21)
Nishi-Funabashi Station - Funabashi Central Hospital - Hinagiku Kindergarten - Suwa Jinja
Nakayama Line (市川05)
Nishi-funabashi Station - Ichikawa Station
Ichikawa City Community Bus Wakuwaku Bus
Tokyo Bay Medical Center - Minami-Gyotoku Station - Gyotoku Station - Myoden Station - Chiba Museum of Science and Industry Media Park Ichikaw

Mascot
A stray cat named "Shishimaru" lived in the company's Shiohama Barn. And, "Toranya" which is a cat originated from "Shishimaru" was created as a mascot in 2021 with the company's 20th anniversary.

See also
Tokyo Bay City Bus
Keisei Bus
Kanto Railway
Kantetsu Green Bus
Kantetsu Purple Bus
Kominato Railway

References

External links

 Timetable

Ichikawa, Chiba
Japanese companies established in 1999
Transport in Chiba Prefecture
Bus companies of Japan